This is a list of ambassadors from Egypt to other countries.

Notes

 
Egypt